This is a list of topics that have, either currently or in the past, been characterized as pseudoscience by academics or researchers. Detailed discussion of these topics may be found on their main pages. These characterizations were made in the context of educating the public about questionable or potentially fraudulent or dangerous claims and practices—efforts to define the nature of science, or humorous parodies of poor scientific reasoning.

Criticism of pseudoscience, generally by the scientific community or skeptical organizations, involves critiques of the logical, methodological, or rhetorical bases of the topic in question. Though some of the listed topics continue to be investigated scientifically, others were only subject to scientific research in the past and today are considered refuted, but resurrected in a pseudoscientific fashion. Other ideas presented here are entirely non-scientific, but have in one way or another impinged on scientific domains or practices.

Many adherents or practitioners of the topics listed here dispute their characterization as pseudoscience. Each section here summarizes the alleged pseudoscientific aspects of that topic.

Physical sciences

Astronomy and space sciences 
 2012 phenomenon – a range of eschatological beliefs that cataclysmic or otherwise transformative events would occur on or around 21 December 2012. This date was regarded as the end-date of a 5,126-year-long cycle in the Mesoamerican Long Count calendar and as such, festivities to commemorate the date took place on 21 December 2012 in the countries that were part of the Maya civilization (Mexico, Guatemala, Honduras and El Salvador), with main events at Chichén Itzá in Mexico and Tikal in Guatemala. Professional Mayanist scholars stated that no extant classic Maya accounts forecast impending doom and that the idea that the Long Count calendar ends in 2012 misrepresented Maya history and culture, while astronomers rejected the various proposed doomsday scenarios easily refuted by elementary astronomical observations.
 Ancient astronauts – a concept based on the belief that intelligent extraterrestrial beings visited Earth and made contact with humans in antiquity and prehistoric times. Proponents suggest that this contact influenced the development of modern cultures, technologies and religions. A common claim is that deities from most, if not all, religions are actually extraterrestrial in origin and that advanced technologies brought to Earth by ancient astronauts were interpreted as evidence of divine status by early humans. The idea that ancient astronauts existed is not taken seriously by academics and has received no credible attention in peer-reviewed studies.
  Anunnaki from Nibiru (Sitchin) (variant) – proposed by Zecharia Sitchin in his series The Earth Chronicles, beginning with The 12th Planet (1976), it revolves around Sitchin's unique interpretation of ancient Sumerian and Middle Eastern texts, megalithic sites, and artifacts from around the world. He hypothesizes that the gods of old Mesopotamia were actually astronauts from the planet "Nibiru", which Sitchin claims the Sumerians believed was a remote "12th planet" (counting the Sun, Moon and Pluto as planets) associated with the god Marduk.  According to Sitchin, Nibiru continues to orbit the Sun on a 3,600-year elongated orbit.
  Ancient astronauts from the Sirius star-system (Temple) (variant) – Robert K. G. Temple's proposal in his book The Sirius Mystery (1976) argues that the Dogon people of northwestern Mali preserved an account of extraterrestrial visitation from around 5,000 years ago. He quotes various lines of evidence, including supposed advanced astronomical knowledge inherited by the tribe, descriptions, and comparative belief systems with ancient civilizations such as ancient Egypt and Sumer.
 Astrology (see also Astrology and science) – consists of a number of belief systems that hold that there is a relationship between astronomical phenomena and events or descriptions of personality in the human world. Several systems of divination are based on the relative positions and movement of various real and construed celestial bodies. Scientific testing of astrology has been conducted and no evidence has been found to support the premises or purported effects outlined in astrological traditions. Where astrology has made falsifiable predictions, it has been falsified.
 Creationist cosmologies are explanations of the origins and form of the universe in terms of the Genesis creation narrative (Genesis 1), according to which the God of the Bible created the cosmos in eight creative acts over the six days of the "creation week".
 Evidence for life on Mars
 The Face on Mars is a rock formation in Cydonia Mensae on Mars asserted to be evidence of intelligent, native life on the planet. High-resolution images taken recently show it to appear less face-like. It features prominently in the works of Richard C. Hoagland and Tom Van Flandern. This effect can also be explained by the psychological phenomenon pareidolia, whereby one assigns meaning (such as facial perception) to an otherwise ambiguous or meaningless stimulus.
 Lunar effect – the belief that the full Moon influences human behavior.
 Modern flat Earth beliefs propose that Earth is a flat, disc-shaped planet that accelerates upward, producing the illusion of gravity. Proposers of a flat Earth, such as the Flat Earth Research Society, do not accept compelling evidence, such as photos of Earth from space.
 Modern geocentrism – In astronomy, the geocentric model (also known as geocentrism or the Ptolemaic system) is a superseded description of the universe with Earth at the center. Under the geocentric model, the Sun, Moon, stars and planets all circled Earth. The geocentric model served as the predominant description of the cosmos in many ancient civilizations, such as those of Aristotle and Ptolemy.
 Moon landing conspiracy theories – claim that some or all elements of the Apollo program and the associated Moon landings were hoaxes staged by NASA with the aid of other organizations. The most notable claim is that the six manned landings (1969–72) were faked and that 12 Apollo astronauts did not actually walk on the Moon. Various groups and individuals have made claims since the mid-1970s that NASA and others knowingly misled the public into believing the landings happened by manufacturing, tampering with or destroying evidence, including photos, telemetry tapes, radio and TV transmissions and Moon rock samples, and even killing some key witnesses.
 Nibiru cataclysm – a prediction first made by contactee Nancy Lieder that a mythological planet Nibiru would collide with Earth. After having adjusted her prediction many times, she later claimed the year of the occurrence to be 2012. In 2017, a conspiracy theorist known as David Meade claimed 2017 was the year Nibiru would hit.
 Vaimānika Shāstra – claim that airplanes were invented in ancient India during the Vedic period. A 1974 study by researchers at the Indian Institute of Science, Bangalore found that the heavier-than-air aircraft that the Vaimānika Shāstra described were aerodynamically unfeasible. The authors remarked that the discussion of the principles of flight in the text were largely perfunctory and incorrect, in some cases violating Newton's laws of motion.
 Worlds in Collision – writer Immanuel Velikovsky proposed in his book Worlds in Collision that ancient texts and geographic evidence show mankind was witness to catastrophic interactions of other planets in our Solar System.

Earth sciences 
 Megalithic geometry or 366 geometry – posits the existence of an Earth-based geometry dating back to at least 3500 BCE and the possibility that such a system is still in use in modern Freemasonry. According to proponents, megalithic civilizations in Britain and Brittany had advanced knowledge of geometry and the size of Earth. The megalithic yard is correlated to the polar circumference of Earth using a circle divided into 366 degrees.
 The Bermuda Triangle – a region of the Atlantic Ocean that lies between Bermuda, Puerto Rico and (in its most popular version) Florida. Ship and aircraft disasters and disappearances perceived as frequent in this area have led to the circulation of stories of unusual natural phenomena, paranormal encounters and interactions with extraterrestrials.
 Climate change denial –  involves denial, dismissal, unwarranted doubt or contrarian views which depart from the scientific consensus on climate change, including the extent to which it is caused by humans, its impacts on nature and human society, or the potential of adaptation to global warming by human actions.
 Flood geology – creationist form of geology that advocates most of the geologic features on Earth are explainable by a global flood.
 The Hollow Earth – a proposal that Earth is either entirely hollow or consists of hollow sections beneath the crust. Certain folklore and conspiracy theories hold this idea and suggest the existence of subterranean life.
 Welteislehre, a.k.a. the World Ice Theory or Glacial Cosmogony – ice is proposed to be the basic substance of all cosmic processes and ice moons, ice planets and the "global ether" (also made of ice) had determined the entire development of the universe.

Physics 
 Autodynamics – a physics theory proposed in the 1940s that claims the equations of the Lorentz transformation are incorrectly formulated to describe relativistic effects, which would invalidate Einstein's theories of special relativity and general relativity, and Maxwell's equations. The theory is discounted by the mainstream physics community.
 E-Cat – a claimed cold fusion reactor.
 Einstein–Cartan–Evans theory – a unified theory of physics proposed by Myron Wyn Evans which claims to unify general relativity, quantum mechanics and electromagnetism. The hypothesis was largely published in the journal Foundations of Physics Letters between 2003 and 2005; in 2008, the editor published an editorial note effectively retracting the journal's support for the hypothesis due to incorrect mathematical claims.
 Electrogravitics – claimed to be an unconventional type of effect or anti-gravity propulsion created by an electric field's effect on a mass. The name was coined in the 1920s by Thomas Townsend Brown, who first described the effect and spent most of his life trying to develop it and sell it as a propulsion system. Follow-ups on the claims (R. L. Talley in a 1990 U.S. Air Force study, NASA scientist Jonathan Campbell in a 2003 experiment and Martin Tajmar in a 2004 paper) have found that no thrust could be observed in a vacuum, consistent with the phenomenon of ion wind.

 Free energy – a class of perpetual motion that purports to create energy (violating the first law of thermodynamics) or extract useful work from equilibrium systems (violating the second law of thermodynamics).
 Water-fueled cars – an instance of perpetual motion machines. Such devices are claimed to use water as fuel or produce fuel from water on board with no other energy input. Many such claims are part of investment frauds.
 Gasoline pill or gasoline powder, which was claimed to turn water into gasoline.
 Hongcheng Magic Liquid – a scam in China where Wang Hongcheng (Chinese: 王洪成; pinyin: Wáng Hóngchéng), a bus driver from Harbin with no scientific education, claimed in 1983 that he could turn regular water into a fuel as flammable as petrol by simply dissolving a few drops of his liquid in it.
 Hydrinos (Randell L. Mills/Brilliant Light Power Inc.) – a supposed state of the hydrogen atom that, according to Mills, is of lower energy than ground state and has extremely high efficiency as a fuel. Critics say it lacks corroborating scientific evidence and is a relic of cold fusion. Critical analysis of the claims have been published in the peer reviewed journals Physics Letters A, New Journal of Physics, Journal of Applied Physics, and Journal of Physics D: Applied Physics stating that the proposed hydrino states are unphysical and incompatible with key equations of quantum mechanics.
Orgone – a pseudoscientific concept described as an esoteric energy or hypothetical universal life force, originally proposed in the 1930s.

Applied sciences

Agriculture 

 Lysenkoism, or Lysenko-Michurinism – was a political campaign against genetics and science-based agriculture conducted by Trofim Lysenko, his followers and Soviet authorities. Lysenko served as the director of the Soviet Union's Lenin All-Union Academy of Agricultural Sciences. Lysenkoism began in the late 1920s and formally ended in 1964. The pseudoscientific ideas of Lysenkoism built on Lamarckian concepts of the heritability of acquired characteristics. Lysenko's theory rejected Mendelian inheritance and the concept of the "gene"; it departed from Darwinian evolutionary theory by rejecting natural selection.
 Biodynamic agriculture – method of organic farming that treats farms as unified and individual organisms.  Biodynamics uses a calendar which has been characterized as astrological. The substances and composts used by biodynamicists have been described as unconventional and homeopathic.  For example, field mice are countered by deploying ashes prepared from field mice skin when Venus is in the Scorpius constellation. No difference in beneficial outcomes has been scientifically established between certified biodynamic agricultural techniques and similar organic and integrated farming practices. Biodynamic agriculture lacks strong scientific evidence for its efficacy and has been labeled a pseudoscience because of its overreliance upon esoteric knowledge and mystical beliefs.

Architecture 
 Feng shui – ancient Chinese system of mysticism and aesthetics based on astronomy, geography and the putative flow of qi. Evidence for its effectiveness is based on anecdote and there is a lack of a plausible method of action; this leads to conflicting advice from different practitioners of feng shui. Feng shui practitioners use this as evidence of variations or different schools; critical analysts have described it thus: "Feng shui has always been based upon mere guesswork." Modern criticism differentiates between feng shui as a traditional proto-religion and the modern practice: "A naturalistic belief, it was originally used to find an auspicious dwelling place for a shrine or a tomb. However, over the centuries it...has become distorted and degraded into a gross superstition."
 Ley lines – proposed intentional alignment of ancient monuments and landscape features was later explained by a statistical analysis of lines that concluded: "the density of archaeological sites in the British landscape is so great that a line drawn through virtually anywhere will 'clip' a number of sites." Additional New Age and feng shui concepts have been proposed building on the original concept and pseudoscientific claims about energy flowing through the lines have been made.
 Vastu shastra is the ancient Hindu system of architecture, which lays down a series of rules for building houses in relation to ambiance. Vastu Shastra is considered as pseudoscience by rationalists like Narendra Nayak of Federation of Indian Rationalist Associations and astronomer Jayant Narlikar, who writes that Vastu does not have any "logical connection" to the environment.

Finance 
 Technical analysis is a security analysis methodology for forecasting the direction of prices through the study of past market data, primarily price and volume. Behavioral economics and quantitative analysis use many of the same tools of technical analysis, which, being an aspect of active management, stands in contradiction to much of modern portfolio theory. The efficacy of both technical and fundamental analysis is disputed by the efficient-market hypothesis, which states that stock market prices are essentially unpredictable. It is still considered by many academics to be pseudoscience. Academics such as Eugene Fama say the evidence for technical analysis is sparse and is inconsistent with the weak form of the efficient-market hypothesis.

Health and medicine 

Pseudoscientific medical practices are often known as quackery. In contrast, modern medicine is (or seeks to be) evidence-based.
 Acupuncture – use of fine needles to stimulate acupuncture points and balance the flow of qi. There is no known anatomical or histological basis for the existence of acupuncture points or meridians and acupuncture is regarded as an alternative medical procedure. Some acupuncturists regard them as functional rather than structural entities, useful in guiding evaluation and care of patients.  Acupuncture has been the subject of active scientific research since the late 20th century and its effects and application remain controversial among medical researchers and clinicians. Some scholarly reviews conclude that acupuncture's effects are mainly attributable to the placebo effect and others find likelihood of efficacy for particular conditions.
 Dry needling is the therapeutic insertion of fine needles without regard to traditional Chinese medicine (TCM) knowledge and is similarly controversial.
 Acupressure is an alternative medicine technique similar in principle to acupuncture. It is based on the concept of life energy, which flows through "meridians" in the body. In treatment, physical pressure is applied to acupuncture points with the aim of clearing blockages in these meridians. Pressure may be applied by hand, by elbow, or with various devices. Some studies have suggested it may be effective at helping manage nausea and vomiting, lower back pain, tension headaches and stomach ache, although such studies have been found to have a high likelihood of bias. Like many alternative medicines, it may benefit from a placebo effect. Quackwatch says acupressure is a dubious practice and its practitioners use irrational methods.
Addiction recovery 12-step models, which rely on a view of addiction and alcoholism as “spiritual diseases” for which the only remedy (although not a cure, as this view defines addiction as chronic and incurable) is a “spiritual conversion” in which a person must surrender their will to a deity.
 Adrenal fatigue or hypoadrenia is a pseudoscientific diagnosis described as a state in which the adrenal glands are exhausted and unable to produce adequate quantities of hormones, primarily the glucocorticoid cortisol, due to chronic stress or infections. Adrenal fatigue should not be confused with a number of actual forms of adrenal dysfunction such as adrenal insufficiency or Addison's disease. The term "adrenal fatigue", which was invented in 1998 by James Wilson, a chiropractor, may be applied to a collection of mostly nonspecific symptoms. There is no scientific evidence supporting the concept of adrenal fatigue and it is not recognized as a diagnosis by any scientific or medical community. A systematic review found no evidence for the term adrenal fatigue, confirming the consensus among endocrinological societies that it is a myth.
 The Alexander Technique, named after its creator Frederick Matthias Alexander, is an educational process that was created to retrain habitual patterns of movement and posture. Alexander believed that poor habits in posture and movement damaged spatial self-awareness as well as health and that movement efficiency could support overall physical well-being. He saw the technique as a mental training technique as well. Alexander began developing his technique's principles in the 1890s in an attempt to address voice loss during public speaking. He credited his method with allowing him to pursue his passion for reciting in Shakespearean theater. Some proponents of the Alexander Technique say that it addresses a variety of health conditions related to cumulative physical behaviors, but there is little evidence to support many of the claims made about the technique. As of 2015, there was evidence suggesting the Alexander Technique may be helpful for both long-term back pain and long-term neck pain and may help people cope with Parkinson's disease. However, both Aetna and the Australian Department of Health have conducted reviews and concluded that the technique has insufficient evidence to warrant insurance coverage.
 Alternative cancer treatments are alternative or complementary treatments for cancer that have not been approved by the government agencies responsible for the regulation of therapeutic goods and have not undergone properly conducted, well-designed clinical trials. Among those that have been published, the methodology is often poor. A 2006 systematic review of 214 articles covering 198 clinical trials of alternative cancer treatments concluded that almost none conducted dose-ranging studies, which are necessary to ensure that the patients are being given a useful amount of the treatment. These kinds of treatments appear and vanish frequently and have done so throughout history.
 Alternative or fringe medicine – The terms alternative medicine, complementary medicine, integrative medicine, holistic medicine, natural medicine, unorthodox medicine, fringe medicine, unconventional medicine and New Age medicine are used interchangeably and are almost synonymous. Terminology shifts over time to reflect the branding of practitioners. Therapies are often framed as "natural" or "holistic", implicitly and intentionally suggesting that conventional medicine is "artificial" and "narrow in scope".
Animal magnetism – also known as mesmerism; was the name given by German doctor Franz Mesmer in the 18th century to what he believed to be an invisible natural force (Lebensmagnetismus) possessed by all living things, including humans, animals and vegetables. He believed that the force could have physical effects, including healing, and he tried persistently but without success to achieve scientific recognition of his ideas.
 Anthroposophic medicine, or anthroposophical medicine, is a form of alternative medicine. Devised in the 1920s by Rudolf Steiner and Ita Wegman, it was based on occult notions and drew on Steiner's spiritual philosophy, which he called anthroposophy. Practitioners employ a variety of treatment techniques based upon anthroposophic precepts. Many drug preparations used in anthroposophic medicine are ultra-diluted substances, similar to those used in homeopathy. Some anthroposophic doctors oppose childhood vaccination and this has led to preventable outbreaks of disease. Professor of complementary medicine Edzard Ernst and other critics have characterized anthroposophic medicine as having no basis in science, pseudoscientific and quackery.
 Apitherapy is a branch of alternative medicine that uses honey bee products, including honey, pollen, propolis, royal jelly and bee venom. Proponents of apitherapy make claims for its health benefits, which remain unsupported by evidence-based medicine.
 Applied kinesiology (AK) is a technique in alternative medicine claimed to be able to diagnose illness or choose treatment by testing muscles for strength and weakness. According to their guidelines on allergy diagnostic testing, the American College of Allergy, Asthma and Immunology stated there is "no evidence of diagnostic validity" of applied kinesiology. Another study has shown that as an evaluative method, AK "is no more useful than random guessing" and the American Cancer Society has said that "scientific evidence does not support the claim that applied kinesiology can diagnose or treat cancer or other illness".
 Aromatherapy uses aromatic materials, including essential oils, and other aroma compounds, with claims for improving psychological or physical well-being. It is offered as a complementary therapy or as a form of alternative medicine, the first meaning alongside standard treatments, the second instead of conventional, evidence-based treatments. Aromatherapists, people who specialize in the practice of aromatherapy, utilize blends of supposedly therapeutic essential oils that can be used as topical application, massage, inhalation or water immersion. There is no good medical evidence that aromatherapy can either prevent, treat, or cure any disease. Placebo-controlled trials are difficult to design, as the point of aromatherapy is the smell of the products. There is disputed evidence that it may be effective in combating postoperative nausea and vomiting.
 Auriculotherapy (also auricular therapy, ear acupuncture, and auriculoacupuncture) is a form of alternative medicine based on the idea that the ear is a micro-system which reflects the entire body, represented on the auricle, the outer portion of the ear. Conditions affecting the physical, mental or emotional health of the patient are assumed to be treatable by stimulation of the surface of the ear exclusively. Similar mappings are used in many areas of the body, including the practices of reflexology and iridology. These mappings are not based on or supported by any medical or scientific evidence and are therefore considered to be pseudoscience.
 Autistic enterocolitis – is the name of a nonexistent medical condition proposed by discredited British gastroenterologist Andrew Wakefield when he suggested a link between a number of common clinical symptoms and signs which he contended were distinctive to autism. The existence of such an enterocolitis has been dismissed by experts as having "not been established". Wakefield's now-retracted and fraudulent report used inadequate controls and suppressed negative findings and multiple attempts to replicate his results have been unsuccessful. Reviews in the medical literature have found no link between autism and bowel disease.
 Ayurveda – traditional Ayurveda is a 5,000-year-old alternative medical practice with roots in ancient India based on a mind-body set of beliefs. Imbalance or stress in an individual's consciousness is believed to be the cause of diseases. Patients are classified by body types (three doshas, which are considered to control mind-body harmony, determine an individual's "body type") and treatment is aimed at restoring balance to the mind-body system. It has long been the main traditional system of health care in India and it has become institutionalized in India's colleges and schools, although unlicensed practitioners are common. As with other traditional knowledge, much of it was lost; in the West, current practice is in part based on the teachings of the Maharishi Mahesh Yogi in the 1980s, who mixed it with Transcendental Meditation; other forms of Ayurveda exist as well. The most notable advocate of Ayurveda in America is Deepak Chopra, who claims that the Maharishi's Ayurveda is based on quantum mysticism.
 Balneotherapy ( "bath") is the presumed benefit from disease by bathing, a traditional medicine technique usually practiced at spas. Balneotherapy may involve hot or cold water, massage through moving water, relaxation, or stimulation. Many mineral waters at spas are rich in particular minerals such as silica, sulfur, selenium and radium. Scientific studies into the effectiveness of balneotherapy do not show that balneotherapy is effective for treating rheumatoid arthritis. There is also no evidence indicating a more effective type of bath, or to indicate that bathing is more effective than physical exercise, relaxation therapy, or mudpacks. Most of the studies on balneotherapy have methodological flaws and are not reliable. A 2009 review of all published clinical evidence concluded that existing research is not sufficiently strong to draw firm conclusions about the efficacy of balneotherapy.
 Bates method – an alternative therapy aimed at improving eyesight. Eye-care physician William Horatio Bates (1860–1931) attributed nearly all sight problems to habitual "strain" of the eyes and thus felt that relieving such "strain" would cure the problems. In 1952, optometry professor Elwin Marg wrote of Bates, "Most of his claims and almost all of his theories have been considered false by practically all visual scientists."
 Biological terrain assessment – a set of computerized tests used to measure the pH, resistivity and redox of a person's urine, blood and saliva, with the intention of recommending a customized program of health supplements and remedies (such as vitamins, homeopathic supplements, or herbal medicines) based on the results. Proponents suggest that BTA allows for a correction of biological imbalances before they become pathological, while opponents claim that the tests are imprecise and result in incorrect diagnoses.
 Biorhythm theory – an attempt to predict various aspects of a person's life through simple mathematical cycles. The theory was developed by Wilhelm Fliess in the late 19th century and was popularized in the United States in the late 1970s. It was described as pseudoscience.
 Body memory (BM) is a hypothesis that the body itself is capable of storing memories, as opposed to only the brain. While experiments have demonstrated the possibility of cellular memory there are currently no known means by which tissues other than the brain would be capable of storing memories. Modern usage of BM tends to frame it exclusively in the context of traumatic memory and ways in which the body responds to recall of a memory. In this regard, it has become relevant in treatment for PTSD.
 Brain Gym – is an organization promoting a series of exercises claimed to improve academic performance. Twenty-six Brain Gym activities are claimed to improve eye teaming (binocular vision), spatial and listening skills, hand–eye coordination and whole-body flexibility and by doing this manipulate the brain, improving learning and recall of information.  The Brain Gym program calls for children to repeat certain simple movements such as crawling, yawning, making symbols in the air and drinking water; these are intended to "integrate", "repattern", and increase blood flow to the brain. Though the organization claims the methods are grounded in good neuroscience, the underlying ideas are pseudoscience.
 Candida hypersensitivity – It has been spuriously claimed that chronic yeast infections are responsible for many common disorders and non-specific symptoms, including fatigue, weight gain, constipation, dizziness, muscle and joint pain, asthma and others. The notion has been strongly challenged by the American Academy of Allergy, Asthma, and Immunology.
 Chelation therapy is claimed by some practitioners of alternative medicine to treat a variety of ailments, including heart disease and autism. While chelation is a valid form of medical treatment, used as a means to treat conditions such as acute heavy metal toxicity, the use of chelation therapy by alternative medicine practitioners for behavioral and other disorders is considered pseudoscientific; there is no proof that it is effective. In addition to being ineffective, chelation therapy prior to heavy metal testing can artificially raise urinary heavy metal concentrations ("provoked" urine testing) and lead to inappropriate and unnecessary treatment. The American College of Medical Toxicology and the American Academy of Clinical Toxicology warn the public that chelating agents used in chelation therapy may have serious side effects, including liver and kidney damage, blood pressure changes, allergies and, in some cases, even death of the patient.
 Chiropractic is a form of alternative medicine mostly concerned with the diagnosis and treatment of mechanical disorders of the musculoskeletal system, especially the spine. Some proponents, especially those in the field's early history, have claimed that such disorders affect general health via the nervous system, through vertebral subluxation, claims which are not based on scientific evidence. The main chiropractic treatment technique involves manual therapy, especially spinal manipulation therapy (SMT), manipulations of other joints and soft tissues. Its foundation is at odds with mainstream medicine and chiropractic is sustained by pseudoscientific ideas, such as vertebral subluxation and "innate intelligence" that reject science.
 Chromotherapy, sometimes called color therapy, colorology or cromatherapy, is an alternative medicine method which is considered pseudoscience. Chromotherapists claim to be able to use light in the form of color to balance "energy" lacking from a person's body, whether it be on physical, emotional, spiritual, or mental levels. Color therapy is distinct from other types of light therapy, such as neonatal jaundice treatment and blood irradiation therapy, which is a scientifically accepted medical treatment for a number of conditions, and from photobiology, the scientific study of the effects of light on living organisms. French skeptic and lighting physicist Sébastien Point considers that LED lamps at domestic radiance are safe in normal use for the general population; he also pointed out the risk of overexposure to light from LEDs for practices like chromotherapy, when duration and time exposure are not under control.
 Chronic Lyme disease (not to be confused with Lyme disease) is a generally rejected diagnosis that encompasses "a broad array of illnesses or symptom complexes for which there is no reproducible or convincing scientific evidence of any relationship to Borrelia burgdorferi infection." Despite numerous studies, there is no clinical evidence that "chronic" Lyme disease is caused by a persistent infection. It is distinct from post-treatment Lyme disease syndrome, a set of lingering symptoms which may persist after successful treatment of infection with Lyme spirochetes. The symptoms of "chronic Lyme" are generic and non-specific "symptoms of life".
 Colon cleansing (a.k.a. colon therapy) encompasses a number of alternative medical therapies claimed to remove nonspecific toxins from the colon and intestinal tract by removing any accumulations of feces.  Colon cleansing may be branded colon hydrotherapy, a colonic or colonic irrigation. During the 2000s, internet marketing and infomercials of oral supplements supposedly for colon cleansing increased. Some forms of colon Hydrotherapy use tubes to inject water, sometimes mixed with herbs or with other liquids, into the colon via the rectum using special equipment. Oral cleaning regimens use dietary fiber, herbs, dietary supplements, or laxatives. People who practice colon cleansing believe that accumulations of putrefied feces line the walls of the large intestine and that these accumulations harbor parasites or pathogenic gut flora, causing nonspecific symptoms and general ill-health. This "auto-intoxication" hypothesis is based on medical beliefs of the Ancient Egyptians and Greeks and was discredited in the early 20th century.
 Colloidal silver (a colloid consisting of silver particles suspended in liquid) and formulations containing silver salts were used by physicians in the early 20th century, but their use was largely discontinued in the 1940s following the development of safer and effective modern antibiotics. Since about 1990, there has been a resurgence of the promotion of colloidal silver as a dietary supplement, marketed with claims of it being an essential mineral supplement, or that it can prevent or treat numerous diseases, such as cancer, diabetes, arthritis, HIV/AIDS, herpes and tuberculosis. No medical evidence supports the effectiveness of colloidal silver for any of these claimed indications. Silver is not an essential mineral in humans; there is no dietary requirement for silver and hence, no such thing as a silver "deficiency". There is no evidence that colloidal silver treats or prevents any medical condition and it can cause serious and potentially irreversible side effects, such as argyria.
 COVID-19 misinformation – multiple theories proposing a wide variety of different things regarding the COVID-19 pandemic, COVID-19 itself and COVID-19 vaccines.
 Craniosacral therapy – is a form of bodywork or alternative therapy using gentle touch to manipulate the synarthrodial joints of the cranium. A practitioner of craniosacral therapy may also apply light touches to a patient's spine and pelvis. Practitioners believe that this manipulation regulates the flow of cerebrospinal fluid and aids in "primary respiration." Craniosacral therapy was developed by John Upledger, D.O. in the 1970s as an offshoot of osteopathy in the cranial field, or cranial osteopathy, which was developed in the 1930s by William Garner Sutherland. According to the American Cancer Society, although CST may relieve the symptoms of stress or tension, "available scientific evidence does not support claims that craniosacral therapy helps in treating cancer or any other disease." CST has been characterized as pseudoscience and its practice has been called quackery. Cranial osteopathy has received a similar assessment, with one 1990 paper finding there was no scientific basis for any of the practitioners' claims the paper examined.
 Cryonics – a field of products, techniques, and beliefs supporting the idea that freezing the clinically dead at very low temperatures (typically below −196 degrees Celsius) will enable future revival or re-substantiation. These beliefs often hinge on the existence of advanced human or alien societies in the distant future who will possess as-of-yet unknown technology for the stabilization of dying cells. There is no evidence a human being can be revived after such freezing and no solid scientific evidence suggests that reanimation will be possible in the future.
 Crystal healing – belief that crystals have healing properties. Once common among pre-scientific and indigenous peoples, it enjoyed a resurgence in popularity in the 1970s with the New Age movement. There is no scientific evidence that crystal healing has any effect.
 Cupping therapy is an ancient form of alternative medicine. Cupping is used in more than 60 countries. Its usage dates back to as far as 1550 B.C. There are different forms of cupping; the most common are dry, wet and fire cupping. Cups are applied onto the skin and a suction is created, pulling the skin up. It is meant to increase blood flow to certain areas to the body. Not a part of medical practice in the modern era, cupping has been characterized as a pseudoscience. There is no good evidence it has any health benefits and there are some risks of harm, especially in case of wet and fire cupping.
 Detoxification – Detoxification in the context of alternative medicine consists of an approach that claims to rid the body of "toxins" – accumulated substances that allegedly exert undesirable effects on individual health in the short or long term.  The concept has received criticism from scientists and health organizations for its unsound scientific basis and lack of evidence for the claims made. The "toxins" usually remain undefined, with little to no evidence of toxic accumulation in the patient. The British organisation Sense about Science has described some detox diets and commercial products as "a waste of time and money", while the British Dietetic Association called the idea "nonsense" and a "marketing myth". In the human body, the processing of chemicals, including those considered 'toxins', is handled by a number of organs, most prominently the liver and kidneys, thus making detoxes unnecessary.
 Digit Ratio – calculated by dividing the length of an index finger by the ring finger of the same hand, has been proposed to correlate with various personality, sexuality, biological, psychological and physical traits/outcomes. The field has been compared to pseudoscience due to irreproducible or contradictory findings, exaggerated claims of usefulness and lack of high quality research protocols.
 Ear candling also called ear coning or thermal-auricular therapy, is a pseudoscientific alternative medicine practice claimed to improve general health and well-being by lighting one end of a hollow candle and placing the other end in the ear canal. Medical research has shown that the practice is both dangerous and ineffective and does not functionally remove earwax or toxicants, despite product design contributing to that impression.

 Earthing therapy or grounding is a therapy that is claimed to ease pain, provide a better night's sleep, and assist with symptoms of inflammation by being in direct physical contact with the ground or a device connected to electrical ground. Practitioners claim that Earth has an excess of electrons which people are missing due to insulating shoes and ground cover. Being in electrical contact with Earth is claimed to provide the body with those excess electrons, which then act as antioxidants. A 2012 systematic review study showed inconclusive results related to methodological issues across the literature. Subsequently, a 2017 systematic review of the benefits of spending time in forests demonstrated positive health effects, but not enough to generate clinical practice guidelines or demonstrate causality.
 Electrohomeopathy (or Mattei cancer cure) is a derivative of homeopathy invented in the 19th century by Count Cesare Mattei. The name is derived from a combination of electro (referring to an electric bio-energy content supposedly extracted from plants and of therapeutic value, rather than electricity in its conventional sense) and homeopathy (referring to an alternative medicinal philosophy developed by Samuel Hahnemann in the 18th century). Electrohomeopathy has been defined as the combination of electrical devices and homeopathy.
 Electromagnetic hypersensitivity (EHS) – reported sensitivity to electric and magnetic fields or electromagnetic radiation of various frequencies at exposure levels well below established safety standards. Symptoms are inconsistent, but can include headache, fatigue, difficulty sleeping and similar non-specific indications. Provocation studies find that the discomfort of sufferers is unrelated to hidden sources of radiation and "no scientific basis currently exists for a connection between EHS and exposure to [electromagnetic fields]."
 Energy medicine, energy therapy, energy healing, vibrational medicine, psychic healing, spiritual medicine, or spiritual healing are branches of alternative medicine based on a pseudoscientific belief that healers can channel healing energy into a patient and effect positive results. This idea itself contains several methods: hands-on, hands-off and distant (or absent) where the patient and healer are in different locations. While early reviews of the scientific literature on energy healing were equivocal and recommended further research, more recent reviews have concluded that there is no evidence supporting clinical efficiency.
 Facilitated communication is a scientifically discredited technique that attempts to aid communication by people with autism or other communication disabilities. The facilitator holds the disabled person's arm or hand during this process and attempts to help them move to type on a keyboard or other device. Research indicates that the facilitator is the source of the messages obtained through FC (involving ideomotor effect guidance of the arm of the patient by the facilitator). Studies have consistently found that FC is unable to provide the correct response to even simple questions when the facilitator does not know the answers to the questions (e.g., showing the patient but not the facilitator an object).
 Faith healing – act of curing disease by such means as prayer and laying on of hands. There is no material benefit observed in excess of that expected by the placebo effect.
 Fasting – Some practitioners of alternative medicine promote "cleansing the body" through fasting; the concept is quackery with no scientific basis for its rationale or efficacy. During the early 20th century, fasting was promoted by alternative health writers such as Hereward Carrington, Edward H. Dewey, Bernarr Macfadden, Frank McCoy, Edward Earle Purinton, Upton Sinclair and Wallace Wattles. All of these writers were either involved in the natural hygiene or new thought movement. In 1911, Sinclair authored The Fasting Cure, which made sensational claims of fasting curing practically all diseases, including cancer, syphilis and tuberculosis. Sinclair has been described as "the most credulous of faddists" and his book is considered an example of quackery.
 Functional medicine is a form of alternative medicine that encompasses a number of unproven and disproven methods and treatments. Its proponents claim that it focuses on the "root causes" of diseases based on interactions between the environment and the gastrointestinal, endocrine and immune systems to develop "individualized treatment plans". Opponents have described it as pseudoscience, quackery and, at its essence, a re-branding of complementary and alternative medicine.
 Germanic New Medicine – On 8 August 1978, Ryke Geerd Hamer's son, Dirk, was shot by the son of the last king of Italy, Vittorio Emanuele of Savoy, while asleep on a yacht off Cavallo and died on 7 December 1978. Sometime after Dirk's death, Hamer began to develop Germanic New Medicine (GNM). According to GNM no real diseases exist; rather, what established medicine calls a "disease" is actually a "special meaningful program of nature" (sinnvolles biologisches Sonderprogramm) to which bacteria, viruses and fungi belong. Hamer's GNM claims to explain every disease and treatment according to those premises and to thereby obviate traditional medicine. The cure is always the resolving of the conflict. Some treatments like chemotherapy or pain relieving drugs like morphine are deadly, according to Hamer. These "laws" are dogmas of GNM, not laws of nature or medicine, and are at odds with scientific understanding of human physiology.
 Germ theory denialism – the pseudoscientific belief that germs do not cause infectious disease and that the germ theory of disease is wrong.
The Great Barrington Declaration – a document that emerged from the American Institute for Economic Research during the COVID-19 pandemic, authored by three scientists. It promised a way to allow people to carry on their normal lives while invoking the impossible idea of "focused protection" for vulnerable people. The epidemiologist Michael Osterholm called it "a dangerous mix of pixie dust and pseudoscience".
 Hair analysis is, in mainstream scientific usage, the chemical analysis of a hair sample. The use of hair analysis in alternative medicine as a method of investigation to assist alternative diagnosis is controversial and its use in this manner has been opposed repeatedly by the AMA because of its unproven status and its potential for health care fraud.
 Health bracelets and various healing jewelry such as ionized bracelets, hologram bracelets and magnetic jewelry, are purported to improve the health, heal, or improve the chi of the wearer.  No claims of effectiveness made by manufacturers have ever been substantiated by independent sources.
 Hexagonal water – A term used in a marketing scam that claims the ability to create a certain configuration of water that is better for the body. The term "hexagonal water" refers to a cluster of water molecules forming a hexagonal shape that supposedly enhances nutrient absorption, removes metabolic wastes and enhances cellular communication, among other things. Similar to the dihydrogen monoxide hoax, the scam takes advantage of the consumer's limited knowledge of chemistry, physics and physiology.
 Homeopathy – the belief that a patient with symptoms of an illness can be treated with extremely dilute remedies that are thought to produce those same symptoms in healthy people.  These preparations are often diluted beyond the point where any treatment molecule is likely to remain. Studies of homeopathic practice have been largely negative or inconclusive. No scientific basis for homeopathic principles has been substantiated.
Bach flower remedies (BFRs) are solutions of brandy and water—the water containing extreme dilutions of flower material developed by Edward Bach, an English homeopath, in the 1930s. Bach claimed that dew found on flower petals retain imagined healing properties of that plant. Systematic reviews of clinical trials of Bach flower solutions have found no efficacy beyond a placebo effect.
 Iridology – means of medical diagnosis which proponents believe can identify and diagnose health problems through close examination of the markings and patterns of the iris. Practitioners divide the iris into 80–90 zones, each of which is connected to a particular body region or organ. This connection has not been scientifically validated and disorder detection is neither selective nor specific. Because iris texture is a phenotypical feature which develops during gestation and remains unchanged after birth (which makes the iris useful for Biometrics), iridology is all but impossible.
 Jilly Juice – a potentially dangerous fermented drink that has been claimed to treat a variety of medical conditions.
 Leaky gut syndrome – in alternative medicine, a proposed condition caused by the passage of harmful substances outward through the gut wall. It has been proposed as the cause of many conditions, including multiple sclerosis and autism, a claim which has been called pseudoscientific. According to the UK National Health Service, the theory is vague and unproven. Some skeptics and scientists say that the marketing of treatments for leaky gut syndrome is either misguided or an instance of deliberate health fraud.
 Lightning Process – a system claimed to be derived from osteopathy, neuro-linguistic programming (NLP) and life coaching. Proponents claim that the Process can have a positive effect on a long list of diseases and conditions, including myalgic encephalomyelitis, despite no scientific evidence of efficacy. The designer of the Lightning Process, Phil Parker, suggests certain illnesses such as ME/CFS arise from a dysregulation of the central nervous system and autonomic nervous system, which the Lightning Process aims to address, helping to break the "adrenaline loop" that keeps the systems' stress responses high.
 Macrobiotic diets (or macrobiotics) are fixed on ideas about types of food drawn from Zen Buddhism. The diet attempts to balance the supposed yin and yang elements of food and cookware. Major principles of macrobiotic diets are to reduce animal products, eat locally grown foods that are in season and consume meals in moderation. Macrobiotics writers often claim that a macrobiotic diet is helpful for people with cancer and other chronic diseases, although there is no good evidence to support such recommendations and the diet can be harmful. Studies that indicate positive results are of poor methodological quality. Neither the American Cancer Society nor Cancer Research UK recommend adopting the diet.
 Magnet therapy – practice of using magnetic fields to positively influence health. While there are legitimate medical uses for magnets and magnetic fields, the field strength used in magnetic therapy is too low to effect any biological change and the methods used have no scientific validity.
 The above is not to be confused with current health treatments involving electromagnetism on human tissue, such as pulsed electromagnetic field therapy (see: Electromagnetic therapy).
 A medical intuitive is an alternative medicine practitioner who claims to use their self-described intuitive abilities to find the cause of a physical or emotional condition through the use of insight rather than modern medicine. Other terms for such a person include medical clairvoyant, medical psychic, or intuitive counselor. In 2009, Steven Novella, writing on Science Based Medicine, calls medical intuitive diagnosis as "purely magical thinking" and refers to a Huffington Post article about it as "a promotion of a dubious pseudoscientific medical claim".
 Morgellons – is the informal name of a self-diagnosed, unexplained skin condition in which individuals have sores that they believe contain some kind of fibers. Morgellons is poorly characterized, but the general medical consensus is that it is a form of delusional parasitosis. An attempt to link Morgellons to the cause of Lyme disease has been attacked by Steven Salzberg as "dangerous pseudoscience".
 Moxibustion – application on or above the skin of smoldering mugwort, or moxa, to stimulate acupuncture points. A Cochrane Review found limited evidence for the use of moxibustion in correcting breech presentation of babies and called for more experimental trials. Side effects included nausea, throat irritation and abdominal pain from contractions. Moxibustion has also been studied for the treatment of pain, cancer, stroke, ulcerative colitis constipation, and hypertension. Systematic reviews have found that these studies are of low quality and positive findings could be due to publication bias.
 Nambudripad's Allergy Elimination Techniques (NAET) are a form of alternative medicine which proponents claim can treat allergies and related disorders. The techniques were devised by Devi Nambudripad, a California-based chiropractor and acupuncturist, in 1983, drawing on a combination of ideas from applied kinesiology, acupuncture, acupressure, nutritional management and chiropractic methods. There is no credible evidence to support its effectiveness in assessing or treating allergies.
 Naturopathy, or naturopathic medicine, is a type of alternative medicine based on a belief in vitalism, which posits that a special energy called vital energy or vital force guides bodily processes such as metabolism, reproduction, growth and adaptation. Naturopathy has been characterized as pseudoscience. It has particularly been criticized for its unproven, disproven, or dangerous treatments. Natural methods and chemicals are not necessarily safer or more effective than artificial or synthetic ones; any treatment capable of eliciting an effect may also have deleterious side effects.
 Negative air ionization therapy is the use of air ionizers as an experimental non-pharmaceutical treatment. It is widely considered pseudoscience.
 Oil pulling –  is a folk remedy where oil is "swished" or "held" in the mouth for up to 20 minutes with the goal of improving oral as well as systemic health. It is said that this technique "pulls out" toxins from the body and is claimed to be able to treat a plethora of conditions from migraines to diabetes.
 Orthomolecular medicine, sometimes referred to as megavitamin therapy, is a form of alternative medicine that aims to maintain human health through nutritional supplementation. The concept builds on the idea of an optimum nutritional environment in the body and suggests that diseases reflect deficiencies in this environment. Treatment for disease, according to this view, involves attempts to correct "imbalances or deficiencies based on individual biochemistry" by use of substances such as vitamins, minerals, amino acids, trace elements and fatty acids. The notions behind orthomolecular medicine are not supported by sound medical evidence and the therapy is not effective; even the validity of calling the orthomolecular approach a form of medicine has been questioned since the 1970s.
 Osteopathic manipulative medicine (OMM) or osteopathic manipulative treatment (OMT) – the core technique of osteopathic medicine. OMM is based on a philosophy devised by Andrew Taylor Still (1828–1917), who held that the body had self-regulating mechanisms that could be harnessed through manipulating the bones, tendons and muscles. It has been proposed as a treatment for a number of human ailments, including Parkinson's disease, pancreatitis and pneumonia, but has only been found to be effective for lower back pain by virtue of the spinal manipulation used. It has long been regarded as rooted in "pseudoscientific dogma". In 2010, Steven Salzberg referred to the OMT-specific training given by colleges of osteopathic medicine as "training in pseudoscientific practices".
 Pulse diagnosis is a diagnostic technique used in Ayurveda, traditional Chinese medicine, traditional Mongolian medicine, Siddha medicine, traditional Tibetan medicine and Unani. It has no scientific legitimacy, and is ill-defined, subjective and unreliable.
 Quantum healing - an alternative medicine which proposes that manipulation of quantum phenomenon will lead to increased health and well being."
 Radionics – means of medical diagnosis and therapy which proponents believe can diagnose and remedy health problems using various frequencies in a putative energy field coupled to the practitioner's electronic device. The first such "black box" devices were designed and promoted by Albert Abrams and were definitively proven useless by an independent investigation commissioned by Scientific American in 1924. The internal circuitry of radionics devices is often obfuscated and irrelevant, leading proponents to conjecture dowsing and ESP as operating principles. Similar devices continue to be marketed under various names, though none is approved by the U.S. Food and Drug Administration; there is no scientific evidence for the efficacy or underlying premise of radionics devices. The radionics of Albert Abrams and his intellectual descendants should not be confused with similarly named reputable and legitimate companies, products, or medical treatments such as radiotherapy or radiofrequency ablation.
 Reiki is a form of alternative medicine called energy healing. Reiki practitioners use a technique called palm healing or hands-on healing through which a "universal energy" is said to be transferred through the palms of the practitioner to the patient in order to encourage emotional or physical healing. Reiki is a pseudoscience, and is used as an illustrative example of pseudoscience in scholarly texts and academic journal articles. It is based on qi ("chi"), which practitioners say is a universal life force, although there is no empirical evidence that such a life force exists. Clinical research has not shown reiki to be effective as a treatment for any medical condition. There has been no proof of the effectiveness of reiki therapy compared to the placebo effect. An overview of reiki investigations found that studies reporting positive effects had methodological flaws. The American Cancer Society stated that reiki should not replace conventional cancer treatment, a sentiment echoed by Cancer Research UK and the National Center for Complementary and Integrative Health. Developed in Japan in 1922 by Mikao Usui, it has been adapted into varying cultural traditions across the world.
 Reflexology, or zone therapy, is an alternative medicine involving the physical act of applying pressure to the feet, hands, or ears with specific thumb, finger and hand techniques without the use of oil or lotion. It is based on what reflexologists claim to be a system of zones and reflex areas that they say reflect an image of the body on the feet and hands, with the premise that such work effects a physical change to the body. A 2009 systematic review of randomized controlled trials concluded that the best evidence available to date does not demonstrate convincingly that reflexology is an effective treatment for any medical condition. There is no consensus among reflexologists on how reflexology is supposed to work; a unifying theme is the idea that areas on the foot correspond to areas of the body and that, by manipulating these, one can improve health through one's qi. Reflexologists divide the body into 10 equal vertical zones, five on the right and five on the left. Concerns have been raised by medical professionals that treating potentially serious illnesses with reflexology, which has no proven efficacy, could delay the seeking of appropriate medical treatment.
 Rolfing (also called Structural Integration) – body manipulation devised by Ida Rolf (1896–1979) claimed by practitioners to be capable of ridding the body of traumatic memories stored in the muscles. There is no evidence that rolfing is effective as a treatment for any condition.
 Therapeutic touch – a form of vitalism where a practitioner, who may be also a nurse, passes their hands over and around a patient to "realign" or "rebalance" a putative energy field. A recent Cochrane Review concluded that "[t]here is no evidence that [Therapeutic Touch] promotes healing of acute wounds." No biophysical basis for such an energy field has been found.
 Tin foil hat – A tin foil hat is a hat made from one or more sheets of aluminium foil, or a piece of conventional headgear lined with foil, worn in the belief it shields the brain from threats such as electromagnetic fields, mind control and mind reading. The usage of a metal foil hat for protection against interference of the mind was mentioned in a science fiction short story by Julian Huxley, "The Tissue-Culture King", first published in 1926, in which the protagonist discovers that "caps of metal foil" can block the effects of telepathy. At this time, no link has been established between the radio-frequency EMR that tin foil hats are meant to protect against and subsequent ill health.
 Traditional Chinese medicine (TCM) – a traditional medical system originating in China and practiced as an alternative medicine throughout much of the world. It contains elements based in the cosmology of Taoism and considers the human body more in functional and vitalistic than anatomical terms. Health and illness in TCM follow the principle of yin and yang and are ascribed to balance or imbalance in the flow of a vital force, qi. Diagnostic methods are solely external, including pulse examination at six points, examination of a patient's tongue and a patient interview; interpractitioner diagnostic agreement is poor. The TCM description of the function and structure of the human body is fundamentally different from modern medicine.
 TCM materia medica – a collection of crude medicines used in traditional Chinese medicine. These include many plants in part or whole, such as ginseng and wolfberry, as well as more exotic ingredients, such as seahorses. Preparations generally include several ingredients in combination, with selection based on physical characteristics such as taste or shape, or relationship to the organs of TCM. Most preparations have not been rigorously evaluated or give no indication of efficacy. Pharmacognosy research for potential active ingredients present in these preparations is active, though the applications do not always correspond to those of TCM.
 Gua sha, kerokan or coining, is part of traditional Chinese medicine (TCM). Its practitioners use a tool to scrape people's skin to cause tissue damage in the belief this has medicinal benefit. Gua sha is sometimes referred to as "scraping", "spooning" or "coining" by English speakers. Edzard Ernst has written that any apparent benefit from gua sha is due to the placebo effect.
 Meridians are the channels through which qi flows, connecting the several zang-fu organ pairs. There is no known anatomical or histological basis for the existence of acupuncture points or meridians.
 Shiatsu is a form of Japanese bodywork based on ideas in traditional Chinese medicine. Shiatsu derives from a Japanese massage modality called anma. There is no evidence that shiatsu is an effective medical treatment.
 Qi – vital energy whose flow must be balanced for health. Qi has never been directly observed and is unrelated to the concept of energy used in science.
 Qigong, qi gong, chi kung, or chi gung is a holistic system of coordinated body posture and movement, breathing and meditation used for the purposes of health, spirituality and martial arts training. With roots in Chinese medicine, philosophy and martial arts, qigong is traditionally viewed as a practice to cultivate and balance qi (chi), translated as "life energy". Research concerning qigong has been conducted for a wide range of medical conditions, including hypertension, pain and cancer, and with respect to quality of life. Most research concerning health benefits of qigong has been of poor quality, such that it would be unwise to draw firm conclusions at this stage.
 Zang-fu – concept of organs as functional yin and yang entities for the storage and manipulation of qi. These organs are not based in anatomy.
 Tomatis Method A type of auditory integration training devised by Alfred A. Tomatis and promoted, without supporting evidence, as being of benefit to people with autism.
 Urine therapy – drinking either one's own undiluted urine or homeopathic potions of urine for treatment of a wide variety of diseases is based on pseudoscience.
 Promotion of a link between autism and vaccines, in which the vaccines are accused of causing autism-spectrum conditions, triggering them, or aggravating them, has been characterized as pseudoscience. Many epidemiological studies have reported no association between either the MMR vaccine and autism, or thimerosal-containing vaccines and autism. Consequently, the Institute of Medicine has concluded that there is no causal link between either of these varieties of vaccines and autism. Similarly, "vaccine overload", a non-medical term describing the notion that giving many vaccines at once may overwhelm or weaken a child's immature immune system and lead to adverse effects is strongly contradicted by scientific evidence.
 Vaccine hesitancy – theories proposing vaccines cause health issues, including Autism Spectrum Disorder, and contain harmful ingredients such as Thiomersal. Studies have found no basis for these claims.
 Vitalism – doctrine that the processes of life are not explicable by the laws of physics and chemistry alone and that life is, in some part, self-determining. The book Encyclopedia of Pseudoscience stated "today, vitalism is one of the ideas that form the basis for many pseudoscientific health systems that claim that illnesses are caused by a disturbance or imbalance of the body's vital force." "Vitalists claim to be scientific, but in fact they reject the scientific method with its basic postulates of cause and effect and of provability. They often regard subjective experience to be more valid than objective material reality."
 Wilson's syndrome (not to be confused with Wilson's disease) is an alternative medicine concept, not recognized as a legitimate diagnosis in evidence-based medicine. Its supporters describe Wilson's syndrome as a mix of common and non-specific symptoms which they attribute to low body temperature and impaired conversion of thyroxine (T4) to triiodothyronine (T3), despite normal thyroid function tests. The American Thyroid Association (ATA) says Wilson's syndrome is at odds with established knowledge of thyroid function, has vague diagnostic criteria and lacks supporting scientific evidence. The ATA further raised concern that the proposed treatments were potentially harmful.
 Wind turbine syndrome and wind farm syndrome are terms for adverse health effects that have been ascribed to the proximity of wind turbines. Proponents have claimed that these effects include death, cancer and congenital abnormality. The distribution of recorded events, however, correlates with media coverage of wind farm syndrome itself and not with the presence or absence of wind farms. Reviews of the scientific literature have consistently found no reason to believe that wind turbines are harmful to health.

Technology 
 5G conspiracies and 5G causes coronavirus theories – theory proposing that 5G causes health issues and also causes COVID-19.

Social sciences

History 
 Christ myth theory – A fringe theory that proposes that the Historical Jesus did not exist in any capacity whatsoever. While the divinity of Jesus is disputed, Christian and non-Christian scholars of antiquity universally agree that Jesus of Nazareth was a Galilean Jew who lived in the first century, was baptized, and later crucified by Roman authorities. This is based on sources written by historians, scholars, and politicians who lived during the time of Christ.
 Historical materialism – Karl Popper criticised Marxist theory of history on the grounds of being unfalsifiable. Specifically, he claimed that while the theory was originally scientific, over time it has been modified and degraded into a non-scientific form. Popper thus viewed Marxism as a pseudoscience. Others who shared a similar view were philosopher Imre Lakatos and sociologist Ernest van den Haag. Popper's stance on historical materialism has itself been subject to criticism.
 Holocaust denial – Historical revisionist movements associated with holocaust denial have employed pseudoscientific evidence and conspiracy theories published in intradiegetic pseudo-academic journals and presented at fringe conferences (e.g. misconstruing cyanide residue studies, claiming despite all evidence to the contrary that gas chambers were built after the war).
 New chronology (Fomenko) – pseudohistorical conspiracy theory which argues that events of antiquity generally attributed to the civilizations of the Roman Empire, Ancient Greece and Ancient Egypt, actually occurred during the Middle Ages, more than a thousand years later.
 Phantom time hypothesis-A Conspiracy theory which argues that the early middle ages (614-911) didn't exist.

Psychology 
 Attachment therapy – common name for a set of potentially fatal clinical interventions and parenting techniques aimed at controlling aggressive, disobedient, or unaffectionate children using "restraint and physical and psychological abuse to seek their desired results." (The term "attachment therapy" may sometimes be used loosely to refer to mainstream approaches based on attachment theory, usually outside the US where the pseudoscientific form of attachment therapy is less known.) Probably the most common form is holding therapy, in which the child is restrained by adults for the purpose of supposed cathartic release of suppressed rage and regression. Perhaps the most extreme, but much less common, is "rebirthing", in which the child is wrapped tightly in a blanket and then made to simulate emergence from a birth canal. This is done by encouraging the child to struggle and pushing and squeezing him/her to mimic contractions. Despite the practice's name, it is not based on traditional attachment theory and shares no principles of mainstream developmental psychology research. In 2006, it was the subject of an almost entirely critical Taskforce Report commissioned by the American Professional Society on the Abuse of Children (APSAC).
 Conversion therapy – sometimes called reparative therapy, seeks to change a non-heterosexual person's sexual orientation so they will no longer have same-sex attraction. The American Psychiatric Association defines reparative therapy as "psychiatric treatment ... which is based upon the assumption that homosexuality per se is a mental disorder or based upon the a priori assumption that a patient should change their sexual homosexual orientation."
 Coding is a catch-all term for various Russian alternative therapeutic methods used to treat addictions, in which the therapist attempts to scare patients into abstinence from a substance they are addicted to by convincing them that they will be harmed or killed if they use it again. Each method involves the therapist pretending to insert a "code" into patients' brains that will ostensibly provoke a strong adverse reaction should it come into contact with the addictive substance. The methods use a combination of theatrics, hypnosis, placebos, and drugs with temporary adverse effects to instill the erroneous beliefs. Therapists may pretend to "code" patients for a fixed length of time, such as five years.
 Eye movement desensitization and reprocessing (EMDR) is a form of psychotherapy in which the person being treated is asked to recall distressing images; the therapist then directs the person in one type of bilateral sensory input, such as side-to-side eye movements or hand tapping. It is included in several guidelines for the treatment of post-traumatic stress disorder (PTSD). Some clinical psychologists have argued that the eye movements do not add anything above imagery exposure and characterize its promotion and use as pseudoscience.
 Facilitated communication (FC), supported typing, or hand over hand, is a scientifically discredited technique that attempts to facilitate communication by people with severe educational and communication disabilities. The facilitator holds or gently touches the disabled person's arm or hand during this process and attempts to help them move to type on a special keyboard. In addition to providing physical support needed for typing or pointing, the facilitator provides verbal prompts and moral support. There is widespread agreement within the scientific community and multiple disability advocacy organizations that FC is not a valid technique for authentically augmenting the communication skills of those with autism spectrum disorder. Instead, research indicates that the facilitator is the source of most or all messages obtained through FC (involving ideomotor effect guidance of the arm of the patient by the facilitator); thus, studies have consistently found that patients are unable to provide the correct response to even simple questions when the facilitator does not know the answers to the questions (e.g., showing the patient but not the facilitator an object) . In addition, numerous cases have been reported by investigators in which disabled persons were assumed by facilitators to be typing a coherent message while the patient's eyes were closed or while they were looking away from or showing no particular interest in the letter board.
 The Feldenkrais Method is a type of exercise therapy devised by Israeli Moshé Feldenkrais (1904–1984) during the mid-20th century.  The method is claimed to reorganize connections between the brain and body and so improve body movement and psychological state. There is no good medical evidence that the Feldenkrais method confers any health benefits. It is not known if it is safe or cost-effective, but researchers do not believe it poses serious risks.
 Graphology – psychological test based on a belief that personality traits or gender unconsciously and consistently influence handwriting morphology—that certain types of people exhibit certain quirks of the pen. Analysis of handwriting attributes provides no better than chance correspondence with personality, and neuroscientist Barry Beyerstein likened the assigned correlations to sympathetic magic. Graphology is only superficially related to forensic document examination, which also examines handwriting.
 Hypnosis – state of extreme relaxation and inner focus in which a person is unusually responsive to suggestions made by the hypnotist. The modern practice has its roots in the idea of animal magnetism, or mesmerism, originated by Franz Mesmer. Mesmer's explanations were thoroughly discredited, and to this day there is no agreement amongst researchers whether hypnosis is a real phenomenon, or merely a form of participatory role-enactment. Some aspects of suggestion have been clinically useful. Other claimed uses of hypnosis more clearly fall within the area of pseudoscience. Such areas include the use of hypnotic regression, including past life regression.
 Hypnotherapy –  therapy that is undertaken with a subject in hypnosis. Using hypnosis for relaxation, mood control, and other related benefits (often related to meditation) is regarded as part of standard medical treatment rather than alternative medicine, particularly for patients subjected to difficult physical emotional stress in chemotherapy.

 Law of attraction –  the maxim that "like attracts like" which, in New Thought philosophy, is used to sum up the idea that by focusing on positive or negative thoughts a person brings positive or negative experiences into their life. Skeptical Inquirer magazine criticized the lack of falsifiability and testability of these claims. Critics have asserted that the evidence provided is usually anecdotal and that, because of the self-selecting nature of the positive reports, as well as the subjective nature of any results, these reports are susceptible to confirmation bias and selection bias. Physicist Ali Alousi, for instance, criticized it as unmeasurable and questioned the likelihood that thoughts can affect anything outside the head.
 Memetics – approach to evolutionary models of cultural information transfer based on the concept that units of information, or "memes", have an independent existence, are self-replicating, and are subject to selective evolution through environmental forces. Starting from a proposition put forward in the writings of Richard Dawkins, it has since turned into a new area of study, one that looks at the self-replicating units of culture. It has been proposed that just as memes are analogous to genes, memetics is analogous to genetics. Memetics has been deemed a pseudoscience on several fronts. Its proponents' assertions have been labeled "untested, unsupported or incorrect". Supporters of memetics include EO Wilson, Douglas Hofstadter and many others.
 Myers–Briggs Type Indicator – a personality test composed of four categories of two types. The test has consistent problems with repeatability, in addition to problems of whether or not it has exhaustive and mutually exclusive classifications. The four categories are Introversion/Extroversion, Sensing/Intuition, Thinking/Feeling, Judging/Perception. Each person is said to have one quality from each category, producing 16 unique types. The Center for Applications of Psychological Type claims that the MBTI is scientifically supported, but most of the research on it is done through its own journal, Journal of Psychological Type, raising questions of bias. Results are said to follow the Barnum effect.
 Neuro-linguistic programming – an approach to communication, personal development, and psychotherapy created in the 1970s. The title refers to a stated connection between the neurological processes ("neuro"), language ("linguistic") and behavioral patterns that have been learned through experience ("programming") and can be organized to achieve specific goals in life. According to certain neuroscientists psychologists and linguists, NLP is unsupported by current scientific evidence, and uses incorrect and misleading terms and concepts. Reviews of empirical research on NLP indicate that NLP contains numerous factual errors, and has failed to produce reliable results for the claims for effectiveness made by NLP's originators and proponents. According to Devilly, NLP is no longer as prevalent as it was in the 1970s and 1980s. Criticisms go beyond the lack of empirical evidence for effectiveness; critics say that NLP exhibits pseudoscientific characteristics, title, concepts and terminology. NLP is used as an example of pseudoscience for facilitating the teaching of scientific literacy at the professional and university level. NLP also appears on peer reviewed expert-consensus based lists of discredited interventions. In research designed to identify the "quack factor" in modern mental health practice, Norcross et al. (2006) list NLP as possibly or probably discredited, and in papers reviewing discredited interventions for substance and alcohol abuse, Norcross et al. (2008) list NLP in the "top ten" most discredited, and Glasner-Edwards and Rawson (2010) list NLP as "certainly discredited".
 Parapsychology – controversial discipline that seeks to investigate the existence and causes of psychic abilities and life after death using the scientific method. Parapsychological experiments have included the use of random number generators to test for evidence of precognition and psychokinesis with both human and animal subjects and Ganzfeld experiments to test for extrasensory perception.
 Phrenology – now defunct system for determining personality traits by feeling bumps on the skull proposed by 18th-century physiologist Franz Joseph Gall. In an early recorded use of the term "pseudo-science", François Magendie referred to phrenology as "a pseudo-science of the present day". The assumption that personality can be read from bumps in the skull has since been thoroughly discredited. However, Gall's assumption that character, thoughts, and emotions are located in the brain is considered an important historical advance toward neuropsychology (see also Localization of brain function, Brodmann's areas, Neuro-imaging, Modularity of mind or Faculty psychology).
 Polygraph ("lie detection") – an interrogation method which measures and records several physiological indices such as blood pressure, pulse, respiration, and skin conductivity while the subject is asked and answers a series of questions. The belief is that deceptive answers will produce physiological responses that can be differentiated from those associated with non-deceptive answers. Many members of the scientific community consider polygraphy to be pseudoscience. Polygraphy has little credibility among scientists. Despite claims of 90–95% validity by polygraph advocates, and 95–100% by businesses providing polygraph services, critics maintain that rather than a "test", the method amounts to an inherently unstandardizable interrogation technique whose accuracy cannot be established. A 1997 survey of 421 psychologists estimated the test's average accuracy at about 61%, a little better than chance. Critics also argue that, even given high estimates of the polygraph's accuracy, a significant number of subjects (e.g., 10% given a 90% accuracy) will appear to be lying, and would unfairly suffer the consequences of "failing" the polygraph.
 Primal therapy – sometimes presented as a science. The Gale Encyclopedia of Psychology (2001) states that: "The theoretical basis for the therapy is the supposition that prenatal experiences and birth trauma form people's primary impressions of life and that they subsequently influence the direction our lives take ... Truth be known, primal therapy cannot be defended on scientifically established principles. This is not surprising considering its questionable theoretical rationale." Other sources have also questioned the scientific validity of primal therapy, some using the term "pseudoscience" (see ).
 Psychoanalysis – body of ideas developed by Austrian physician Sigmund Freud and his followers, which is devoted to the study of human psychological functioning and behavior. Although psychoanalysis is a strong influence within psychiatry, it has been controversial ever since its inception. It is considered pseudoscience by some. Karl Popper characterized it as pseudoscience based on psychoanalysis failing the requirement for falsifiability. Frank Cioffi argued that "though Popper is correct to say that psychoanalysis is pseudoscientific and correct to say that it is unfalsifiable, he is mistaken to suggest that it is pseudoscientific because it is unfalsifiable. [...] It is when [Freud] insists that he has confirmed (not just instantiated) [his empirical theses] that he is being pseudoscientific."
 Sluggish schizophrenia – a diagnosis used in some Communist nations to justify the involuntary commitment of political dissidents to mental institutions.
 Subliminal advertising – visual or auditory information discerned below the threshold of conscious awareness, which is claimed to have a powerful enduring effect on consuming habits. It went into disrepute in the late 1970s, but there has been renewed research interest recently. The mainstream of accepted scientific opinion does not hold that subliminal perception has a powerful, enduring effect on human behaviour.

Racial theories 

 Scientific racism – claim that scientific evidence shows the inferiority or superiority of certain races.

Aryanism – the claim that there is a distinct "Aryan race" which is superior to other putative races, was an important tenet of Nazism, and "the basis of the German government policy of exterminating Jews, Gypsies, and other 'non-Aryans.'"
 Drapetomania was a conjectural mental illness that, in 1851, American physician Samuel A. Cartwright hypothesized as the cause of enslaved Africans fleeing captivity. It has since been debunked as pseudoscience and part of the edifice of scientific racism.
 Melanin theory – belief founded in the distortion of known physical properties of melanin, a natural polymer, that posits the inherent superiority of dark-skinned people and the essential inhumanity and inferiority of light-skinned people.
Turkish History Thesis – the belief that Turks from Central Asia migrated and brought civilization to China, India, the Middle East, and Europe.
Sun Language Theory – the belief that all languages had their origins in the Turkish language.
 Eugenics – As a movement, eugenics was associated with pseudoscience including pseudoscientific journals and professional societies.

Sociology
 Alpha and beta male – pseudoscientific terms for men derived from alpha and beta animals in ethology. Often used by members of the manosphere, these terms have been criticized by scientists and are often considered sexist.
 Strauss–Howe generational theory – claims that history moves through four 20-year "turnings" that repeat sequentially in a fixed pattern approximately every 80 years.
 Unilineal evolution – Before Darwin's work On the Origin of Species, some models incorporated Enlightenment ideas of social progress, and thus, according to philosopher of science Michael Ruse, were pseudoscientific by current standards, and may have been viewed as such during the 18th century, as well as into the start of the 19th century (though the word pseudoscience may not have been used in reference to these early proposals). This pseudoscientific, and often political, incorporation of social progress with evolutionary thought continued for some 100 years following the publication of Origin of Species.

Paranormal and ufology 
Paranormal subjects have been critiqued from a wide range of sources including the following claims of paranormal significance:
 Animal mutilations – cases of animals, primarily domestic livestock, with seemingly inexplicable wounds. These wounds have been said to be caused by extraterrestrials, cults, covert government organizations, or cryptids such as el chupacabra, when in fact most such cases were found to be caused by natural predation.
 An aura or human energy field is, according to New Age beliefs, a colored emanation said to enclose a human body or any animal or object. In some esoteric positions, the aura is described as a subtle body. Psychics and holistic medicine practitioners often claim to have the ability to see the size, color and type of vibration of an aura. In New Age alternative medicine, the human aura is seen as a hidden anatomy that affect the health of a client, and is often understood to comprise centers of vital force called chakra. Such claims are not supported by scientific evidence and are pseudoscience. When tested under controlled experiments, the ability to see auras has not been shown to exist.
 Channeling – communication of information to or through a person allegedly from a spirit or other paranormal entity.
 Crop circles – geometric designs of crushed or knocked-over crops created in a field. Aside from skilled farmers or pranksters working through the night, explanations for their formation include UFOs and anomalous, tornado-like air currents. The study of crop circles has become known as "cerealogy".
 Cryptozoology – search for creatures that are considered not to exist by most biologists. Well-known examples of creatures of interest to cryptozoologists include Bigfoot, the Yeren, the Yeti, and the Loch Ness Monster. According to leading skeptical authors Michael Shermer and Pat Linse, "Cryptozoology ranges from pseudoscientific to useful and interesting, depending on how it is practiced."
 Dowsing refers to practices said to enable one to detect hidden water, metals, gemstones or other objects.
 Electronic voice phenomenon – purported communication by spirits through tape recorders and other electronic devices.
 Extra-sensory perception – paranormal ability (independent of the five main senses or deduction from previous experience) to acquire information by means such as telepathy, clairvoyance, precognition, psychometry, psychic abilities, and remote viewing.
 Ghost hunting is the process of investigating locations that are reported to be haunted by ghosts. Typically, a ghost-hunting team will attempt to collect evidence supporting the existence of paranormal activity. Ghost hunters use a variety of electronic devices, including EMF meters, digital thermometers, both handheld and static digital video cameras, including thermographic and night vision cameras, as well as digital audio recorders. Other more traditional techniques are also used, such as conducting interviews and researching the history of allegedly haunted sites. Ghost hunters may also refer to themselves as "paranormal investigators." Ghost hunting has been heavily criticized for its dismissal of the scientific method. No scientific study has ever been able to confirm the existence of ghosts. The practice is considered a pseudoscience by the vast majority of educators, academics, science writers, and skeptics. Science historian Brian Regal described ghost hunting as "an unorganized exercise in futility".
 Lizard people – The idea of a reptilian reconquest was popularized by David Icke, a conspiracy theorist who claims shape-shifting reptilian aliens control Earth by taking on human form and gaining political power to manipulate human societies. Icke has stated on multiple occasions that many world leaders are, or are possessed by, so-called reptilians.
 Levitation – act of rising up from the ground without any physical aids, usually by the power of thought.
 Palmistry – the belief that the future can be foretold through palm reading. Predictions are based on the shape, line, and mounts of the hands. Palmists use cold reading in order to appear psychic.
 Parapsychology  – (see Psychology section above)
 Pseudoarchaeology – investigation of the ancient past using alleged paranormal or other means which have not been validated by mainstream science.
 Psychic surgery – a type of medical fraud, popular in Brazil and the Philippines. Practitioners use sleight of hand to make it appear as though they are reaching into a patient's body and extracting "tumors". Psychic surgery is usually explicit deception; i.e., the "practitioners" are aware that they are practicing fraud or "quackery".
 Psychokinesis – paranormal ability of the mind to influence matter or energy at a distance.
 Rumpology  – neologism referring to a pseudoscience akin to physiognomy, performed by examining crevices, dimples, warts, moles and folds of a person's buttocks in much the same way a chirologist would read the palm of the hand.
 Séances – ritualized attempts to communicate with the dead.
 The Tunguska event was an actual large explosion, possibly caused by a meteoroid or comet, in what is now Krasnoyarsk Krai, Russia in June 1908. Night skies as far away as London were markedly brighter for several evenings. Unsupported theories regarding the event include the impact of a miniature black hole or large body of antimatter, ball lightning, a test by Nikola Tesla of the apparatus at Wardenclyffe Tower, and a UFO crash. Another theory is that the explosion was caused by a piece of Biela's Comet from 1883.
 Ufology – the study of unidentified flying objects (UFOs) that sometimes includes the belief that UFOs are evidence of extraterrestrial visitors.

Numerology 
 Numerology (including the numerology practices of Kabbalah) – a set of beliefs in a divine, mystical, or other special relationship between a number and coinciding events. Numerology is regarded as pseudomathematics or pseudoscience by modern scientists. It is often associated with the paranormal, alongside astrology and similar divinatory arts.
 Scriptural codes – the belief that a book or fragment of holy scripture contains encoded messages that impart esoteric knowledge. One such decoding method involves identifying "equidistant letter sequences" that spell out such messages.

Religious and spiritual beliefs 
Spiritual and religious practices and beliefs, according to astronomer Carl Sagan, are normally not classified as pseudoscience. However, religion can sometimes nurture pseudoscience, and "at the extremes it is difficult to distinguish pseudoscience from rigid, doctrinaire religion", and some religions might be confused with pseudoscience, such as traditional meditation. The following religious/spiritual items have been related to or classified as pseudoscience in some way:
 Affirmative prayer is a form of prayer or a metaphysical technique that is focused on a positive outcome, rather than a negative situation. For instance, a person who is experiencing some form of illness would focus the prayer on the desired state of perfect health and affirm this desired intention "as if already happened" rather than identifying the illness and then asking God for help to eliminate it. William James described affirmative prayer as an element of the American metaphysical healing movement that he called the "mind-cure"; he described it as America's "only decidedly original contribution to the systemic philosophy of life." What sets affirmative prayer apart from secular affirmations of the autosuggestion type taught by the 19th century self-help author Émile Coué (whose most famous affirmation was "Every day in every way, I am getting better and better") is that affirmative prayer addresses the practitioner to God, the Divine, the Creative Mind, emphasizing the seemingly practical aspects of religious belief.
 Christian Science is generally considered a Christian new religious movement; however, some have called it "pseudoscience"  because its founder, Mary Baker Eddy, used "science" in its name, and because of its former stance against medical science.  Also, "Eddy used the term Metaphysical science to distinguish her system both from materialistic science and from occult science." The church now accepts the use of medical science. Vaccinations were banned, but in 1901, Eddy, at the age of 80, advised her followers to submit to them.
 Energy is used by writers and practitioners of various esoteric forms of spirituality and alternative medicine to refer to a variety of claimed experiences and phenomena that defy measurement and thus can be distinguished from the scientific form of energy. There is no scientific evidence for the existence of such energy. Therapies that purport to use, modify, or manipulate unknown energies are thus among the most contentious of all complementary and alternative medicines. Claims related to energy therapies are most often anecdotal (from single stories), rather than being based on repeatable empirical evidence.
 Exorcism (from Greek ἐξορκισμός, exorkismós "binding by oath") is the religious or spiritual practice of evicting demons or other spiritual entities from a person, or an area, that is believed to be possessed. Depending on the spiritual beliefs of the exorcist, this may be done by causing the entity to swear an oath, performing an elaborate ritual, or simply by commanding it to depart in the name of a higher power. The practice is ancient and part of the belief system of many cultures and religions.  Requested and performed exorcism began to decline in the United States by the 18th century and occurred rarely until the latter half of the 20th century, when the public saw a sharp rise due to the media attention exorcisms were getting. There was "a 50% increase in the number of exorcisms performed between the early 1960s and the mid-1970s".
 Koranic scientific foreknowledge (or Qur'anic science or Hadeeth science) asserts that foundational Islamic religious texts made accurate statements about the world that science verified hundreds of years later. This belief is a common theme in Bucailleism. According to Turkish American physicist Taner Edis, many Muslims appreciate technology and respect the role that science plays in its creation. As a result, he says there is a great deal of Islamic pseudoscience attempting to reconcile science with their religious beliefs. Edis maintains that the motivation to read modern scientific truths into holy books is also stronger for Muslims than Christians. This is because, according to Edis, true criticism of the Quran is almost non-existent in the Muslim world, causing Muslims to believe that scientific truths simply must appear in the Quran.

Creation science 
Creation science or scientific creationism is a branch of creationism that claims to provide scientific support for the Genesis creation narrative in the Book of Genesis and disprove or reexplain the scientific facts, theories and scientific paradigms about geology, cosmology, biological evolution, archaeology, history and linguistics.
 Baraminology – taxonomic system that classifies animals into groups called "created kinds" or "baramins" according to the account of creation in the book of Genesis and other parts of the Bible.
 Creation biology – subset of creation science that tries to explain biology without macroevolution.
 Creationist cosmologies – cosmologies which, among other things, allow for a universe that is only thousands of years old.
 Flood geology – creationist form of geology that advocates most of the geologic features on Earth are explainable by a global flood.
 Searches for Noah's Ark – attempts to find the burial site of Noah's Ark that, according to the Genesis flood narrative, is located somewhere in the alleged "Mountains of Ararat". There have been numerous expeditions with several false claims of success; the practice is widely regarded as pseudoscience, more specifically pseudoarchaeology.
 Intelligent design – maintains that "certain features of the universe and of living things are best explained by an intelligent cause, not an undirected process such as natural selection." These features include:
 Irreducible complexity – claim that some biological systems are too complex to have evolved from simpler systems. It is used by proponents of intelligent design to argue that evolution by natural selection alone is incomplete or flawed, and that some additional mechanism (an "Intelligent Designer") is required to explain the origins of life.
 Specified complexity – claim that when something is simultaneously complex and specified, one can infer that it was produced by an intelligent cause (i.e., that it was designed) rather than being the result of natural processes.

Scientology 
 Dianetics, a therapeutic technique promoted by Scientology, purports to treat a hypothetical reactive mind. There is no scientific evidence for the existence of an actual reactive mind, apart from the stimulus response mechanisms documented in behaviorist psychology.
 Narconon and Purification Rundown are Scientology programs that purport to clean the human body of toxins and drugs respectively. Their method consists of very long saunas over many days, extremely large (possibly toxic) doses of vitamins including niacin, and Scientology 'training routines', sometimes including attempts at telekenesis. The programs have been described as "medically unsafe", "quackery" and "medical fraud", while academic and medical experts have dismissed Narconon's educational programme as containing "factual errors in basic concepts such as physical and mental effects, addiction and even spelling". In turn, Narconon has claimed that mainstream medicine is "biased" against it, and that "people who endorse so-called controlled drug use cannot be trusted to review a program advocating totally drug-free living." Narconon has said that criticism of its programmes is "bigoted", and that its critics are "in favor of drug abuse [...] they are either using drugs or selling drugs".

Other 
 Quantum mysticism – builds on a superficial similarity between certain New Age concepts and such seemingly counter-intuitive quantum mechanical concepts as the uncertainty principle, entanglement, and wave–particle duality, while generally ignoring the limitations imposed by quantum decoherence. One of the most abused ideas is Bell's theorem, which proves the nonexistence of local hidden variables in quantum mechanics. Despite this, Bell himself rejected mystical interpretations of the theory.
 Transcendental Meditation (TM) refers to a specific form of silent mantra meditation and less commonly to the organizations that constitute the Transcendental Meditation movement. The Maharishi Mahesh Yogi created and introduced the TM technique and TM movement in India in the mid-1950s. It is not possible to say whether meditation has any effect on health, as the research is of poor quality, and is marred by a high risk for bias due to the connection of researchers to the TM organization and by the selection of subjects with a favorable opinion of TM.

Idiosyncratic ideas 
The following concepts have only a very small number of proponents, yet have become notable:
 Aquatic ape hypothesis – the idea that certain ancestors of modern humans were more aquatic than other great apes and even many modern humans and, as such, were habitual waders, swimmers and divers.
 Lawsonomy – proposed philosophy and system of claims about physics made by baseball player and aviator Alfred William Lawson.
 Morphic resonance – The idea put forth by Rupert Sheldrake that "natural systems, such as termite colonies, or pigeons, or orchid plants, or insulin molecules, inherit a collective memory from all previous things of their kind". It is also claimed to be responsible for "mysterious telepathy-type interconnections between organisms".
 N rays – A hypothesized form of radiation described by Prosper-René Blondlot in 1903 which briefly inspired significant scientific interest, but were subsequently found to have been a result of confirmation bias.
 Penta Water – claimed acoustically induced structural reorganization of liquid water into long-lived small clusters of five molecules each. Neither these clusters nor their asserted benefits to humans have been shown to exist.
 Polywater – hypothetical polymerized form of water proposed in the 1960s with a higher boiling point, lower freezing point, and much higher viscosity than ordinary water. It was later found not to exist, with the anomalous measurements being explained by biological contamination. Chains of molecules of varying length (depending on the temperature) tend to form in normal liquid water without changing the freezing or boiling point.
 Time Cube – a website created by Gene Ray, in 1997, where he sets out his personal model of reality, which he calls Time Cube. He suggests that all of modern physics is wrong, and his Time Cube model proposes that each day is really four separate days occurring simultaneously.
 Timewave zero – numerological formula that was invented by psychonaut Terence McKenna with the help of the hallucinogenic drug dimethyltryptamine. After experiencing 2012 doomsday predictions, he redesigned his formula to have a "zero-point" at the same date as the Mayan longcount calendar.
 Torsion field – hypothetical physical field responsible for extra-sensory perception, homeopathic cures, levitation, telepathy, clairvoyance, telekinesis, and other paranormal phenomena. Despite the several obvious contradictions with established physics along with associated statements by believers criticized as being "nonsensical" by reputable scientists, torsion fields have been embraced as an explanation for claims of such paranormal phenomena. The harnessing of torsion fields has been claimed to make everything possible from miracle cure devices (including devices that cure alcohol addiction) to working perpetual motion machines, stargates, UFO propulsion analogs, and weapons of mass destruction (WMDs). Some such devices, in particular the miracle cure boxes, have been patented, manufactured and sold.

See also 

 Blood type diet
 Blood type personality theory
 Cargo cult science
 Church of the SubGenius
 Crank (person)
 Denialism
 Fan death
 Fringe science
 Fringe science organizations
 List of books about skepticism
 List of cognitive biases
 List of common misconceptions
 List of conspiracy theories
 List of cryptids
 List of diagnoses characterized as pseudoscience
 List of memory biases
 List of patent medicines
 Observational error
 Occam's razor
 Paradigm shift
 'Pataphysics
 Pathological science
 Philosophy of science
 Protoscience
 Pseudomathematics
 Pseudophilosophy
 Pyramidology

Notes

References

Further reading

External links 
 'The Reading room' by The Skeptics Society
 Stories by Michael Shermer published in Scientific American Magazine.
  – a set of questions to distinguish truth from bogus claims.

Pseudoscience
Scientific skepticism
Science-related lists
pseudoscience
Wikipedia glossaries using unordered lists